Slim Lake is an unorganized territory in Saint Louis County, Minnesota, United States, located north of Ely and Morse Township. The population was 75 at the 2000 census.

Geography
According to the United States Census Bureau, the unorganized territory has a total area of 143.1 square miles (370.6 km2); 132.8 square miles (344.0 km2) is land and 10.3 square miles (26.6 km2) (7.18%) is water.

Demographics
At the 2000 census there were 75 people, 33 households, and 17 families living in the unorganized territory. The population density was 0.6 people per square mile (0.2/km2). There were 103 housing units at an average density of 0.8/sq mi (0.3/km2).  The racial makeup of the unorganized territory was 100.00% White.
Of the 33 households 15.2% had children under the age of 18 living with them, 54.5% were married couples living together, and 45.5% were non-families. 33.3% of households were one person and 9.1% were one person aged 65 or older. The average household size was 2.06 and the average family size was 2.72.

The age distribution was 14.7% under the age of 18, 10.7% from 18 to 24, 30.7% from 25 to 44, 32.0% from 45 to 64, and 12.0% 65 or older. The median age was 42 years. For every 100 females, there were 127.3 males. For every 100 females age 18 and over, there were 113.3 males.

The median household income was $49,643 and the median family income  was $69,167. Males had a median income of $46,250 versus $36,339 for females. The per capita income for the unorganized territory was $30,240. There were no families and 15.8% of the population living below the poverty line, including no under eighteens and none of those over 64.

References

Populated places in St. Louis County, Minnesota
Unorganized territories in Minnesota